Advanced glycation end products (AGEs) are proteins or lipids that become glycated as a result of exposure to sugars. They are a bio-marker implicated in aging and the development, or worsening, of many degenerative diseases, such as diabetes, atherosclerosis, chronic kidney disease, and Alzheimer's disease.

Dietary sources
Animal-derived foods that are high in fat and protein are generally AGE-rich and are prone to further AGE formation during cooking. However, only low molecular weight AGEs are absorbed through diet, and vegetarians have been found to have higher concentrations of overall AGEs compared to non-vegetarians. Therefore, it is unclear whether dietary AGEs contribute to disease and aging, or whether only endogenous AGEs (those produced in the body) matter. This does not free diet from potentially negatively influencing AGE, but potentially implies that dietary AGE may deserve less attention than other aspects of diet that lead to elevated blood sugar levels and formation of AGEs.

Effects

AGEs affect nearly every type of cell and molecule in the body and are thought to be one factor in aging and some age-related chronic diseases. They are also believed to play a causative role in the vascular complications of diabetes mellitus.

AGEs arise under certain pathologic conditions, such as oxidative stress due to hyperglycemia in patients with diabetes.  AGEs play a role as proinflammatory mediators in gestational diabetes as well.

In the context of cardiovascular disease, AGEs can induce crosslinking of collagen, which can cause vascular stiffening and entrapment of low-density lipoprotein particles (LDL) in the artery walls. AGEs can also cause glycation of LDL which can promote its oxidation. Oxidized LDL is one of the major factors in the development of atherosclerosis. Finally, AGEs can bind to RAGE (receptor for advanced glycation end products) and cause oxidative stress as well as activation of inflammatory pathways in vascular endothelial cells.

In other diseases
AGEs have been implicated in Alzheimer's Disease,  cardiovascular disease,  and stroke. The mechanism by which AGEs induce damage is through a process called cross-linking that causes intracellular damage and apoptosis. They form photosensitizers in the crystalline lens, which has implications for cataract development. Reduced muscle function is also associated with AGEs.

Pathology
AGEs have a range of pathological effects, such as:
 Increased vascular permeability.
 Increased arterial stiffness
 Inhibition of vascular dilation by interfering with nitric oxide.
 Oxidizing LDL.
 Binding cells—including macrophage, endothelial, and mesangial—to induce the secretion of a variety of cytokines. 
 Enhanced oxidative stress.
 Hemoglobin-AGE levels are elevated in diabetic individuals and other AGE proteins have been shown in experimental models to accumulate with time, increasing from 5-50 fold over periods of 5–20 weeks in the retina, lens and renal cortex of diabetic rats. The inhibition of AGE formation reduced the extent of nephropathy in diabetic rats. Therefore, substances that inhibit AGE formation may limit the progression of disease and may offer new tools for therapeutic interventions in the therapy of AGE-mediated disease.
 AGEs have specific cellular receptors; the best-characterized are those called RAGE. The activation of cellular RAGE on endothelium, mononuclear phagocytes, and lymphocytes triggers the generation of free radicals and the expression of inflammatory gene mediators. Such increases in oxidative stress lead to the activation of the transcription factor NF-κB and promote the expression of NF-κB regulated genes that have been associated with atherosclerosis.

Reactivity
Proteins are usually glycated through their lysine residues. In humans, histones in the cell nucleus are richest in lysine, and therefore form the glycated protein N(6)-Carboxymethyllysine (CML).

A receptor nicknamed RAGE, from receptor for advanced glycation end products, is found on many cells, including endothelial cells, smooth muscle, cells of the immune system  from tissue such as lung, liver, and kidney. This receptor, when binding AGEs, contributes to age- and diabetes-related chronic inflammatory diseases such as atherosclerosis, asthma, arthritis, myocardial infarction, nephropathy, retinopathy, periodontitis and neuropathy. The pathogenesis of this process hypothesized to activation of the nuclear factor kappa B (NF-κB) following AGE binding. NF-κB controls several genes which are involved in inflammation.

Clearance
In clearance, or the rate at which a substance is removed or cleared from the body, it has been found that the cellular proteolysis of AGEs—the breakdown of proteins—produces AGE peptides and "AGE free adducts" (AGE adducts bound to single amino acids). These latter, after being released into the plasma, can be excreted in the urine.

Nevertheless, the resistance of extracellular matrix proteins to proteolysis renders their advanced glycation end products less conducive to being eliminated. While the AGE free adducts are released directly into the urine, AGE peptides are endocytosed by the epithelial cells of the proximal tubule and then degraded by the endolysosomal system to produce AGE amino acids. It is thought that these acids are then returned to the kidney's inside space, or lumen, for excretion.
 
AGE free adducts are the major form through which AGEs are excreted in urine, with AGE-peptides occurring to a lesser extent but accumulating in the plasma of patients with chronic kidney failure.

Larger, extracellularly derived AGE proteins cannot pass through the basement membrane of the renal corpuscle and must first be degraded into AGE peptides and AGE free adducts. Peripheral macrophage as well as liver sinusoidal endothelial cells and Kupffer cells
 
have been implicated in this process, although the real-life involvement of the liver has been disputed.

Large AGE proteins unable to enter the Bowman's capsule are capable of binding to receptors on endothelial and mesangial cells and to the mesangial matrix. Activation of RAGE induces production of a variety of cytokines, including TNFβ, which mediates an inhibition of metalloproteinase and increases production of mesangial matrix, leading to glomerulosclerosis and decreasing kidney function in patients with unusually high AGE levels.

Although the only form suitable for urinary excretion, the breakdown products of AGE—that is, peptides and free adducts—are more aggressive than the AGE proteins from which they are derived, and they can perpetuate related pathology in diabetic patients, even after hyperglycemia has been brought under control.

Some AGEs have an innate catalytic oxidative capacity, while activation of NAD(P)H oxidase through activation of RAGE and damage to mitochondrial proteins leading to mitochondrial dysfunction can also induce oxidative stress. A 2007  study found that AGEs could significantly increase expression of TGF-β1, CTGF, Fn mRNA in NRK-49F cells through enhancement of oxidative stress, and suggested that inhibition of oxidative stress might underlie the effect of ginkgo biloba extract in diabetic nephropathy. The authors suggested that antioxidant therapy might help prevent the accumulation of AGEs and induced damage. In the end, effective clearance is necessary, and those suffering AGE increases because of kidney dysfunction might require a kidney transplant.

In diabetics who have an increased production of an AGE, kidney damage reduces the subsequent urinary removal of AGEs, forming a positive feedback loop that increases the rate of damage. In a 1997 study, diabetic and healthy subjects were given a single meal of egg white (56 g protein), cooked with or without 100 g of fructose; there was a greater than 200-fold increase in AGE immunoreactivity from the meal with fructose.

Potential therapy

AGEs are the subject of ongoing research. There are three therapeutic approaches: preventing the formation of AGEs, breaking crosslinks after they are formed and preventing their negative effects.

Compounds that have been found to inhibit AGE formation in the laboratory include Vitamin C, Agmatine, benfotiamine, pyridoxamine, alpha-lipoic acid,  taurine, pimagedine, aspirin, carnosine, metformin, pioglitazone, and pentoxifylline. Activation of the TRPA-1 receptor by lipoic acid or podocarpic acid has been shown to reduce the levels of AGES by enhancing the detoxification of methylglyoxal, a major precursor of several AGEs.

Studies in rats and mice have found that natural phenols such as resveratrol and curcumin  can prevent the negative effects of the AGEs.

Compounds that are thought to break some existing AGE crosslinks include Alagebrium (and related ALT-462, ALT-486, and ALT-946) and N-phenacyl thiazolium bromide. One in vitro study shows that rosmarinic acid out performs the AGE breaking potential of ALT-711.

There is, however, no agent known that can break down the most common AGE, glucosepane, which appears 10 to 1,000 times more common in human tissue than any other cross-linking AGE.

Some chemicals, on the other hand, like aminoguanidine, might limit the formation of AGEs by reacting with 3-deoxyglucosone.

See also
Glycosylation
Glyoxalase system
Methylglyoxal
Raw foodism
N(6)-Carboxymethyllysine
Lipofuscin

References

Biomolecules
Post-translational modification
Senescence